Critical data studies is the systematic study of data and its criticisms. The field was named by scholars Craig Dalton and Jim Thatcher. Prior to its naming, significant interest in critical data studies was generated by danah boyd and Kate Crawford, who posed a set of research questions for the critical study of big data and its impacts on society and culture. As its name implies, critical data studies draws heavily on the influence of critical theory which it applies to the study of data. Subsequently, others have worked to further solidify a field called critical data studies. Some of the other key scholars in this discipline include Rob Kitchin and Tracey P. Lauriault. Scholars have attempted to make sense of data through different theoretical frameworks, some of which include analyzing data technically, ethically, politically/economically, temporally/spatially, and philosophically. Some of the key academic journals related to critical data studies include the Journal of Big Data and Big Data and Society.

Motivation

In their article in which they coin the term 'critical data studies,' Dalton and Thatcher also provide several justifications as to why data studies is a discipline worthy of a critical approach. First, 'big data' is an important aspect of twenty-first century society, and the analysis of 'big data' allows for a deeper understanding of what is happening and for what reasons. Furthermore, big data as a technological tool and the information that it yields are not neutral, according to Dalton and Thatcher, making it worthy of critical analysis in order to identify and address its biases. Building off this idea, another justification for a critical approach is that the relationship between big data and society is an important one, and therefore worthy of study.  Dalton and Thatcher stress how the relationship is not an example of technological determinism, but rather how big data can shape the lives of individuals. Big data technology can cause significant changes in society's structure and in the everyday lives of people, and, being a product of society, big data technology is worthy of sociological investigation. Moreover, data sets are almost never completely raw, that is to say without any influences. Rather, data are shaped by the vision or goals of a research team, and during the data collection process, certain things are quantified, stored, sorted and even discarded by the research team. A critical approach is thus necessary in order to understand and reveal the intent behind the information being presented. Moreover, data alone cannot speak for themselves; in order to possess any concrete meaning, data must be accompanied by theoretical insight or alternative quantitative or qualitative research measures. Dalton and Thatcher argue that if one were to only think of data in terms of its exploitative power, there is no possibility of using data for revolutionary, liberatory purposes. Finally, Dalton and Thatcher propose that a critical approach in studying data allows for 'big data' to be combined with older, 'small data,' and thus create more thorough research, opening up more opportunities, questions and topics to be explored.

Issues and concerns for critical data scholars

The use of data in modern society brings about new ways of understanding and measuring the world, but also brings with it certain concerns or issues. Data scholars attempt to bring some of these issues to light in their quest to be critical of data. Rob Kitchin identifies both technical and organizational issues of data, as well as some normative and ethical questions. Technical and organization issues concerning data range from the scope of datasets, access to the data, the quality of the data, the integration of the data, the application of analytics and ecological fallacies, as well as the skills and organizational capabilities of the research team. Some of the normative and ethical concerns addressed by Kitchin include surveillance through one's data (dataveillance), the privacy of one's data, the ownership of one's data, the security of one's data, anticipatory or corporate governance, and profiling individuals by their data. All of these concerns must be taken into account by scholars of data in their objective to be critical.

Following in the tradition of critical urban studies, other scholars have raised similar concerns around data and digital information technologies in the urban context. For example, Joe Shaw and Mark Graham have examined these in light of Henri Lefebvre's 'right to the city'.

Institutional framing of critical data studies
A range of universities have institutionally committed to critical data studies as a significant field by way of hosting systematic meetings on the topic, creating job positions or designating components of degree programmes to it.

References

Sources
 Dalton, Craig, and Jim Thatcher. "What does a critical data studies look like, and why do we care? Seven points for a critical approach to ‘big data’." Society and Space open site (2014). Retrieved October 23, 2016.
 Elkins, James R. "The Critical Thinking Movement: Alternating Currents in One Teacher's Thinking". myweb.wvnet.edu(1999). Retrieved 29 November 2016.
 Kitchin, Rob. The data revolution: Big data, open data, data infrastructures and their consequences. Sage, 2014. Retrieved October 23, 2016.
 Kitchin, Rob, and Tracey P. Lauriault. "Towards critical data studies: Charting and unpacking data assemblages and their work." (2014). Retrieved October 23, 2016.

Data management
Critical theory
Information science
Media studies